State Route 184 (SR 184) is a  state highway that serves as an east-west connection between Sheffield and SR 101. SR 184 intersects US 43/US 72 at its western terminus and SR 101 at its eastern terminus in Lawrence County.

Route description
SR 184 begins at its intersection with US 43/72 in Sheffield. From this point, the route travels in an easterly direction intersecting SR 133 and the access road to the Northwest Alabama Regional Airport. SR 184 then continues its eastern track through its eastern terminus at SR 101.

Major intersections

References

184
Transportation in Colbert County, Alabama
Transportation in Lawrence County, Alabama